Mary Regan (born 16 April 1982) is an Irish journalist. She is currently a political reporter for RTÉ News. She formerly held the role of political editor with UTV Ireland, and previously held the same role at the Irish Examiner and was a regular panelist on Tonight with Vincent Browne.

Career
Regan worked in the RTÉ newsroom and before becoming a political columnist for Vincent Browne's Village magazine.

In 2006, while writing for the Irish Examiner she was awarded the "Young Journalist of the Year", as well as GSK Medical Media Awards' "National Journalist of the Year". She joined the Examiner's political team in 2008. She has also reported from Uganda, Ethiopia, the Middle East, Europe and the US, including from the White House.

In 2011, Regan participated in the US State Department's International Visitor Leadership Program in she was invited to Washington D.C. She was also awarded an Edward R. Murrow professional scholarship for journalists.

Personal life
Regan was born in Moycullen, County Galway. She graduated with a degree in Journalism from Dublin City University before completing a Masters in European Politics in University College Dublin.

She married the RTÉ news presenter Paul O'Flynn in 2012.

She is the sister of Irish film actress and model Emma Eliza Regan.

References

1982 births
Living people
Irish journalists
RTÉ newsreaders and journalists
People from County Galway